Putting Pants On Philip is a silent short film starring British/American comedy duo Laurel and Hardy. Made in 1927, it is their first "official" film together as a team. The plot involves Laurel as Philip, a young Scot newly arrived in the United States, in full kilted splendor, suffering mishaps involving the kilt. His uncle, played by Hardy, is shown trying to put trousers on him.

The duo appeared in a total of 107 films between 1921 and 1950. The idea for the film was Stan Laurel's and was based on a story recounted by a friend while Laurel worked in music hall. Archivist William K. Everson described the film as "one of the real gems of comedy from the late 1920s, and perhaps the most individual of all the Laurel and Hardy comedies, though not necessarily the funniest."

Plot

Piedmont Mumblethunder (Hardy) is awaiting the arrival of his Scottish nephew Philip (Laurel) at a pier. Piedmont does not know what Philip looks like, but knows from a letter that Philip is so shy around women that he "sees spots" when around them. Upon seeing a kilted man misbehaving during the ship's doctor's routine examination, Piedmont tells a bystander that he pities whoever has to pick up this passenger—only to realize the kilted man is Philip. Initially regarding the kilt-wearing Philip as rather effeminate, Piedmont tries to make conversation with him, and escorts him through town. Gradually, Philip demonstrates that he is anything but shy around women, and is, instead, an incorrigible skirt-chaser. At one point, Philip loses his underwear and then walks over a ventilator grate that blows his kilt up, making two women pass out.

Thoroughly embarrassed by his nephew, Piedmont takes Philip to a tailor to be fitted for trousers, which Philip detests. Philip leaves the tailor to continue pursuing a young woman he saw earlier. Catching up with her, Philip takes off his kilt to cover a mud puddle. Rejecting this act of chivalry, the woman simply leaps over the puddle and leaves. Piedmont subsequently steps on the kilt and falls into a deep, mud-covered hole. The film ends on a close-up of Oliver Hardy's face showing "a soon to be classic look of chagrin."

Production
Although this was their first "official" film as a team, the iconic Stan and Ollie characters and costumes had yet to become a permanent fixture. Their first appearance as the now familiar "Stan and Ollie" characters was in The Second Hundred Years, directed by Fred Guiol and supervised by Leo McCarey, who suggested that the performers be teamed permanently.

The film was partially shot at the historic Culver Hotel. The film was released on December 3, 1927.

Cast
 Stan Laurel – Philip
 Oliver Hardy – Piedmont J. Mumblethunder
 Charles A. Bachman – Officer
 Ed Brandenberg  – Bus conductor
 Harvey Clark – Tailor
 Dorothy Coburn – Girl chased by Philip
 Sam Lufkin – Ship's doctor

References

Citations

General bibliography 
 Everson, William K. The Complete Films of Laurel and Hardy. New York: Citadel, 2000, 1967. . 
 Gehring, Wes D. Laurel & Hardy: A Bio-Bibliography. Burnham Bucks, UK: Greenwood Press, 1990. 
 Mitchell, Glenn. The Laurel & Hardy Encyclopedia. New York: Batsford, 2010; First edition 1995. .

External links
 
 
 

1927 films
1927 comedy films
1927 short films
American silent short films
American black-and-white films
Laurel and Hardy (film series)
Films directed by Clyde Bruckman
Films with screenplays by H. M. Walker
1920s American films
Silent American comedy films
1920s English-language films